The 1952–53 season was Fussball Club Basel 1893's 59th season in their existence. It was their seventh consecutive season in the top flight of Swiss football after their promotion from the Nationalliga B the season 1945–46. They played their home games in the Landhof, in the Wettstein Quarter in Kleinbasel. Jules Düblin was the club's chairman for the seventh successive season.

Overview 
At the beginning of the season René Bader took over the job as club trainer from Ernst Hufschmid who had acted as trainer the previous five years. Bader acted as player-coach and Willy Dürr was his assistant coach, he stood at the side line when Bader played.

Basel played a total of 43 games during this season. Of these 26 games were in the domestic league, four games were in the Swiss Cup and 13 were test games. The test games resulted with seven victories, three were drawn and three ended with defeats. In total, including the test games and the cup competition, they won 27 games, drew 11 and lost five times. In the 43 games they scored 146 goals and conceded 72 goals.

There were fourteen teams contesting in the 1952–53 Nationalliga A and the bottom two teams in the league table were to be relegated. Basel won 17 of the 26 games, losing only once, and they scored 72 goals conceding 38. Basel won the championship four points clear of Young Boys in second position and ten points ahead of Grasshopper Club Zürich who were third. Josef Hügi was the team's top league goal scorer. He shared the title of the league top scorer with Eugen Meier (Young Boys) both having netted 32 times during the season. Three players were teams joint second best league scorers René Bader, Walter Bannwart and Bielser each scored nine times.

In the Swiss Cup Basel started in the 3rd principal round with a 10–0 win against Helvetia Bern and in the 4th round they beat Thun 5–0. In the next round they won 4–1 against Grenchen. All three games were home ties. In the quarter-finals Basel were drawn away against Servette Genève and the tie went into extra time, Basel then losing 3–4.

Players

Results 
Legend

Friendly matches

Pre-season and mid-season

Winter break to end of season

Nationalliga A

League matches

League table

Swiss Cup

See also
 History of FC Basel
 List of FC Basel players
 List of FC Basel seasons

References

Sources 
 Rotblau: Jahrbuch Saison 2014/2015. Publisher: FC Basel Marketing AG. 
 Die ersten 125 Jahre. Publisher: Josef Zindel im Friedrich Reinhardt Verlag, Basel. 
 The FCB team 1952–53 at fcb-archiv.ch
 Switzerland 1952–53 by Erik Garin at Rec.Sport.Soccer Statistics Foundation

External links
 FC Basel official site

FC Basel seasons
Basel
1952-53